Ischyrochampsa is an extinct monospecific genus of Late Cretaceous crocodyliform belonging to the eusuchian clade Allodaposuchidae. Fossils of the type species I. meridionalis are late Campanian in age and were found in the commune of Saint-Estève-Janson in Bouches-du-Rhône, France. Material is also known from Spain.

Ischyrochampsa was first classified as a trematochampsid, but was removed from the group by subsequent studies. In their description of Allodaposuchus remains from southern France, Martin and his colleagues treated the genus as a possible junior synonym of Allodaposuchus.

References

Neosuchians
Prehistoric pseudosuchian genera
Late Cretaceous reptiles of Europe
Late Cretaceous crocodylomorphs of Europe
Fossil taxa described in 1995